The cotechino is an Italian large pork sausage requiring slow cooking; usually it is simmered at low heat for several hours. Its name comes from cotica (rind), but it may take different names depending on its various locations of production.
According to tradition, it is served with lentils on New Year's Eve, because lentils—due to their shape—are 'credited' with bringing money in the coming year. 

It is prepared by filling the natural casing with rind, pork meat (usually of secondary preference), and fat mixed with salt and spices; in industrial production, nitrites and nitrates are added as preservatives. Some similar sausages exist in the Italian cooking tradition, for example musetto and zampone which are made with different meat and parts of the pig, musetto being made with meat taken from the pig's muzzle and zampone being held together by the pig's rear leg skin.

Varieties of cotechino

The cotechino Modena has PGI status, meaning its recipe and production are preserved under Italian and European law.

Six Italian regions have so far declared cotechino a traditional food: 
Emilia-Romagna: see above (Cotechino Modena) 
Lombardy: cotechino (Cremona, Bergamo, Mantua, Pavia)
Molise: cotechino
Trentino: pork cotechino
Veneto/Friuli-Venezia Giulia: recognises seven different products: coeghin nostran of Padua; coessin co la lengua of Vicenza, coessin of Vicenza, coessin of Val Leogra, coessin in onto of Vicenza, coessin co lo sgrugno, cotechino di puledro and Musetto of Friuli-Venezia Giulia.
Irpinia: cotechino pezzente

See also

Cotechino Modena
Italian cuisine
 List of Italian dishes
Venetian cuisine

Notes

External links
History of cotechino

Italian sausages